Fast Reliable Seaways (FRS GmbH & Co KG) commonly known as FRS is a German transportation company specializing in passenger ferry and freight transportation. It originally started as a regional passenger ferry operator founded in 1866. Since then, it has expanded in recent years to an international business group and became one of Europe's leading ferry operators. FRS provides conventional ferries, as well as high speed ferries. With 70 vessels and approximately 2,000 employees worldwide, FRS transports 7.9 million passengers and 2.1 million vehicles per year. The company group has its headquarters in Northern Germany, Flensburg and comprises 17 subsidiaries located in Europe, North Africa, Middle East and North America. Focusing on national and international ferry and catamaran operations, FRS also specializes in Offshore Logistics, Port Management, Crewing and Maritime Consulting.

Subsidiaries
If FRS Iberia and FRS Maroc are counted as separate entities, FRS includes 17 subsidiaries.

Ferry operators
ÆrøXpressen, connecting the island of Ærø to the Danish mainland
Clipper Navigation, of Seattle, Washington, United States, acquired in 2016
FRS Helgoline, serving Heligoland and the lower Elbe
FRS Iberia/Maroc, operating in the Strait of Gibraltar, Canary Islands and Balearic Islands.
FRS Syltfähre, connecting the German island of Sylt and the Danish island of Rømø
National Ferries Company, operating in Oman
Reederei Hiddensee, a subsidiary of Weiße Flotte, serving the island of Hiddensee
Weiße Flotte, with service in the Baltic Sea, as well as electric ferries for passengers in Berlin and Wolfsburg

Other services
Albanian Ferry Terminal Operator, managing ports on the Adriatic Sea
FRS Offshore, an operator of offshore service vessels along the north coast of Germany
FRS Windcat Offshore Logistics, a joint venture with Windcat Workboats 
FRS Ship Management, providing crewing and software

Fleet

Fast Ferries (vehicle and passenger) 

 HSC Ceuta Jet, operated by FRS Iberia S.L. (since 1998)
 HSC Algeciras Jet, operated by FRS Iberia S.L. (since 1999)
 HSC Tarifa Jet, operated by FRS Iberia S.L. (since 2006)
 HSC Hormuz, operated by FRS Management (since 2008)
 MS Jawharat Masirah, operated by FRS Management (since 2013)
 MS Shannah, operated by FRS Management (since 2013)
 HSC Al Hallaniyat, operated by FRS Management (since 2013)
 HSC Sawqrah, operated by FRS Management (since 2013)
 HSC Masirah 4, operated by FRS Management (since 2013)

Fast Ferries (passengers only) 

 Taxiboot Pirat, operated by Reederei Hiddensee GmbH (since 1993)
 Taxiboot Störtebeker, operated by Reederei Hiddensee GmbH (since 1993)
 HSC San Gwann, operated by FRS-Fast Reliable Seaways, LLC (since 2016)
 HSC M/V Victoria Clipper V, operated by Clipper Navigation, Inc. (since 2018), prior HSC 
 HSC M/V San Juan Clipper, operated by Clipper Navigation, Inc. (since 2018), prior HSC
 HSC  , operated by FRS Helgoline GmbH & Co. KG (2003–2017)
 HSC Newbuild, operated by FRS Helgoline GmbH & Co. KG (since 2018)

Combi-Ferries / Ro-Pax-Ferries 

 MS Tanger Express, operated by FRS Iberia S.L. (since 2003, modernized in 2015)
 MS Kattegat, operated by FRS Iberia S.L. (since 2013, modernized 2015)
 MS Al Andalus Express, operated by FRS Iberia S.L. (since 2016)
 MS Miramar Express, operated by FRS Iberia S.L. (since 2016)

Conventional passenger ferries

 MS Gellen, operated by Reederei Hiddensee GmbH (since 1993)
 MS Schaprode, operated by Reederei Hiddensee GmbH (since 1993)
 MS Insel Hiddensee, operated by Reederei Hiddensee GmbH (since 1995)
 MS Altefähr, operated by Weiße Flotte GmbH (since 1996)
 MS Hansestadt Stralsund, operated by Reederei Hiddensee GmbH (since 1996)
 MS Bültenkieker, operated by Weiße Flote GmbH (since 1996)
 MS Hanseblick, operated by Weiße Flotte GmbH (since 2009)
 Wappen von Breege, operated by Weiße Flotte GmbH (since 2016)
 MS Kleine Freiheit, operated by FRS HanseFerry (since 2017), prior Seebad Juliusruh, operated by Weiße Flotte GmbH (since 2016)
 MS Sundevit, operated by Reederei Hiddensee GmbH (since 1992)
 MS Alfagen, operated by FRS Management (since 2015)
 MS Knipan, operated by FRS Management (since 2015)
 MS Viggen, operated by FRS Management (since 2015)
 MS Ejdern, operated by FRS Management (since 2015)
 MS Gudingen, operated by FRS Management (since 2015)
 MS Skiftet, operated by FRS Management (since 2015)

Double-ended car ferries

 MF RömöExpress|MS RömöExpress (2019–present)
 MF SyltExpress|MS SyltExpress (2005–present)
 MF Vitte (1992–present)
 MF Stahlbrode (1994–present)
 MF Glewitz (1994–present)
 MF Warnow (1995–present)
 MF Breitling (1995–present)
 MF Wittow (1996–present)
 MF Stralsund (1995–present) 
 Nordic Duck

Solar Ferries 

 SF Fährbär 1, operated by Weiße Flotte GmbH, used in Berlin (since 2014)
 SF Fährbär 2, operated by Weiße Flotte GmbH, used in Berlin (since 2014)
 SF Fährbär 3, operated by Weiße Flotte GmbH, used in Berlin (since 2014)
 SF Fährbär 4, operated by Weiße Flotte GmbH, used in Berlin (since 2014)
 SF Sünje, operated by Weiße Flotte GmbH, used in Wolfsburg (since 2015)
 SF Aluna, operated by Norddeutsche Binnenreederei GmbH (since 2017/2018)

Crew Transfer Vessels (CTV) 

 CTV Windcat 28, operated by FRS Windcat Offshore Logistics (FWOL), used for Offshore-Windparks in the German Baltic Sea (since 2012)
 CTV Windcat 34, operated by FWOL, used in the German Baltic Sea (since 2014)
 CTV Windcat 35, operated by FWOL, used in the German Baltic Sea (since 2014)
 CTV Windcat 40, operated by FWOL, used in the German Baltic Sea (since 2016)

Taxiboats 

 MY Störtebeker, operated by Reederei Hiddensee GmbH (since 1993)
 MY Pirat, operated by Reederei Hiddensee GmbH (since 1993)

Icebreaker 

 Swanti, operated by Weiße Flotte GmbH

Hovercraft-Boat

 Nordic Jet, betrieben durch die Nordic Jetline

Rowing boat

 Paule III, operated by Weiße Flotte GmbH (since 2015)

Fleet of operated vessels
 MS Atlantis (2005–2014; chartered)
 HSC Tanger Jet, later Dolphin Jet (2001–2011)
 HSC Thundercat 1 (2004–2008)
 MS Kloar Kimming (2007; chartered)
 HSC Hanse Jet (1996–2004)
 HSC Baltic Jet (1997–2004)
 HSC Flying Viking (2002–2003)
 HSC Cat No. 1 (1999–2006)
 MS Wappen von Hamburg (1983–2005)
 MS Helgoland (2004–2005)
 MS Wilhemlshaven (2004–2005)
 MF Vikingland (1979–2007)
 MF Westerland (1979–2006)
 MS Baltic Star (1975–2000)
 MS Dania (1980–2001)
 MS Ostsee (1969–1986)
 MS Ostsee (1990–1998)
 MS Nordsee I (1975–1998)
 MS Poseidon (1977–2002)
 MS Wappen von Flensburg (1992–1999)
 MS Seemöwe (1993–2003)
 MS Seemöwe II (1975–2003)
 MS Mommark (1969–2003)
 MS Fritz Reuter (1990–1999)
 MS Mecklenburg (1992–1999)
 MS Fehmarn I (1975–1999)
 MS Viking (1968–1999)
 MS Kollund (1966–1998)
 MS Glücksburg (1959–1998)
 MS Afrodite (1970–1998)
 MS Jürgensby (1968–1998)
 MS Baltica I / Habicht II (1977–1995)
 MS Mürwik (1937–1945)
 MS Mürwik (1959–1990)
 MS Wappen von Heiligenhafen (1981–1988)
 MS Stadt Flensburg (1971–1987)
 MS Meierwik (1963–1987)
 MS Reiher II (1979–1986)
 MS Albatros (1935–1971)
 MS Albatros (1977–1986)
 MS Alexandra (1935–1986)
 MS Moby Dick / Moby Dick I (1970–1985)
 MS Forelle (1935–1984)
 MS Danica (1980–1983)
 MS Langballigau (1965–1977)
 MS Libelle (1935–1976)
 MS Habicht (1935–1957)

Routes

References

External links
 FRS Holding official site (en|de)
 Spain-Morocco traffic (en|de|fr|es)
 Nordic Jet Line Estonia-Finland traffic (en|fi|ee)
 Rømø-Sylt ferry traffic (de|da)
 Island Helgoland traffic (de)
 Weiße Flotte GmbH (de)
 Island Hiddensee traffic (de)
 Consultancy for ferry operations by FRS (en)

Ferry companies of Germany